Pierucci is an Italian surname. Notable people with the surname include:

 Candice Pierucci, American politician
Fra Armando Pierucci (born 1935), Franciscan Italian musician
 Fernando Pierucci (born 1979), former Argentine professional football player
 Frédéric Pierucci, (born 1968), former senior manager for Alstom
 Silvana Pierucci (born 1929), Italian long jumper
 Tomi Pierucci (born 1983), Argentine entrepreneur

See also 
 Pier Bucci
 Pucci

Italian-language surnames
Surnames from given names
it:Pierucci
Surnames of Italian origin